Sasang station is a railway station of the Gyeongbu Line and Gaya Line of Korail located in Gwaebeop-dong, Sasang District, Busan. It is also served by Mugunghwa-ho trains on the Gyeongbu Line.

References

External links 
 Railroad station, from Korail 

Railway stations in Busan
Sasang District
Railway stations opened in 1921